All That Jazz is a 1979 American musical drama film directed by Bob Fosse. The screenplay, by Robert Alan Aurthur and Fosse, is a semi-autobiographical fantasy based on aspects of Fosse's life and career as a dancer, choreographer and director. The film was inspired by Fosse's manic effort to edit his film Lenny while simultaneously staging the 1975 Broadway musical Chicago. It borrows its title from the Kander and Ebb tune "All That Jazz" in that production.

The film won the Palme d'Or at the 1980 Cannes Film Festival. At the 52nd Academy Awards it was nominated for nine Oscars, winning four: Best Original Score, Best Art Direction, Best Costume Design, and Best Film Editing.

In 2001, All That Jazz was deemed "culturally, historically, or aesthetically significant" by the Library of Congress and selected for preservation in the United States National Film Registry.

Plot
Joe Gideon is a theater director and choreographer trying to balance staging his latest Broadway musical, NY/LA, while editing a Hollywood film he has directed, The Stand-Up. He is an alcoholic, a driven workaholic who chain-smokes cigarettes, and a womanizer who constantly flirts and has sex with a stream of women. Each morning he starts his day by playing a tape of Vivaldi while taking doses of Visine, Alka-Seltzer, and Dexedrine, always finishing by looking at himself in the mirror and telling himself "It's showtime, folks!" Joe's ex-wife, Audrey Paris, is involved with the production of the show, but disapproves of his womanizing ways. Meanwhile, his girlfriend Katie Jagger and daughter Michelle keep him company. In his imagination, he flirts with an angel of death called Angelique in a nightclub setting, chatting with her about his life.

As Joe continues to be dissatisfied with his editing job, repeatedly making minor changes to a single monologue, he takes his anger out on the dancers and in his choreography, putting on a highly sexualized number with topless women during one rehearsal and frustrating both Audrey and the show's penny-pinching backers. The only moment of joy in his life occurs when Katie and Michelle perform a Fosse-style number for Joe as an homage to the upcoming release of The Stand-Up, moving him to tears. During a particularly stressful table-read of NY/LA, Joe experiences severe chest pains and is admitted to the hospital with severe angina. Joe brushes off his symptoms, and attempts to leave to go back to rehearsal, but he collapses in the doctor's office and is ordered to stay in the hospital for several weeks to rest his heart and recover from his exhaustion. NY/LA is postponed, but Gideon continues his antics from the hospital bed, continuing to smoke and drink while having endless strings of women come through his room; as he does, his condition continues to deteriorate, despite Audrey and Katie both remaining by his side for support. A negative review for The Stand-Up — which has been released during Joe's time in the hospital — comes in despite the film's monetary success, and Gideon has a massive coronary event.

As Joe undergoes coronary artery bypass surgery, the producers of NY/LA realize that the best way to recoup their money and make a profit is to bet on Gideon's dying: the insurance proceeds would result in a profit of over half a million dollars. As Gideon goes on life support, he directs extravagant musical dream sequences in his own head starring his daughter, wife, and girlfriend, who all berate him for his behavior; he realizes he cannot avoid his own death, and has another heart attack. As the doctors try to save him, Joe runs away from his hospital bed behind their backs and explores the basement of the hospital and the autopsy ward before he allows himself to be taken back. He goes through the five stages of grief — anger, denial, bargaining, depression and acceptance — featured in the stand-up routine he had been editing, and as he gets closer to death, his dream sequences become more and more hallucinatory. As the doctors try one more time to save him, Joe imagines a monumental variety show featuring everyone from his past where he takes center stage in an extensive musical number ("Bye Bye Life", a whimsical parody of "Bye Bye Love"). In his dying dream, Joe is able to thank his family and acquaintances as he cannot from his hospital bed, and his performance receives a massive standing ovation. Joe finally dreams of himself traveling down a hallway to meet Angelique at the end, as the film abruptly cuts to his corpse being zipped up in a body bag.

Cast

Music

Soundtrack 
 "On Broadway" – George Benson
 "Perfect Day" – Harry Nilsson
 "There's No Business Like Show Business" – Ethel Merman
 "Concerto alla rustica (Vivaldi Concerto in G)" – Antonio Vivaldi. This theme recurs throughout the film during Joe's morning regimens.
 "South Mt. Sinai Parade" – Ralph Burns

Numbers 
 "Take Off with Us" – Paul
 "Take Off with Us (Airotica)" – Sandahl Bergman and Dancers
 "Everything Old Is New Again" – danced by Michelle and Kate (to recording of Peter Allen)
 "Hospital Hop" – Paul
 "After You've Gone" – Audrey with Kate and Michelle (Leland Palmer, Ann Reinking and Erzsébet Földi)
 "There'll Be Some Changes Made" – Kate with Audrey and Michelle
 "Who's Sorry Now?" – Female Ensemble with Kate, Audrey and Michelle
 "Some of These Days" – Michelle with Kate and Audrey
 "Bye Bye Life" (from the Everly Brothers' "Bye Bye Love") – O'Connor and Joe with Ensemble

Charts

Production
With increasing production costs and a loss of enthusiasm for the film, Columbia brought in Fox to finance completion, and the latter studio acquired domestic distribution rights in return.

The film's structure is often compared to Federico Fellini's 8½, another thinly veiled autobiographical film with fantastic elements.

The story's structure closely mirrors Fosse's own health issues at the time. While trying to edit Lenny and choreograph Chicago, Fosse suffered a massive heart attack and underwent open heart surgery.

The part of Audrey Paris—Joe's ex-wife and continuing muse, played by Leland Palmer—closely reflects that of Fosse's wife, the dancer and actress Gwen Verdon, who continued to work with him on projects including Chicago and All That Jazz itself.

Gideon's rough handling of chorus girl Victoria Porter closely resembles Bob Fosse's own treatment of Jennifer Nairn-Smith during rehearsals for Pippin. Nairn-Smith herself appears in the film as Jennifer, one of the NY/LA dancers.

Ann Reinking was one of Fosse's sexual partners at the time and was more or less playing herself in the film, but nonetheless she was required to audition for the role as Gideon's girlfriend, Kate Jagger.

Cliff Gorman was cast in the titular role of The Stand-Up—the film-within-a-film version of Lenny—after having played the role of Lenny Bruce in the original theatrical production of the show (for which he won a Tony Award), but was passed over for Fosse's film version of the production in favor of Dustin Hoffman.

Critical reception
As of October 2021, All That Jazz has an 87% "Fresh" rating on review aggregation site Rotten Tomatoes based on 45 reviews, with an average rating of 7.7/10. The site's consensus stated: "Director Bob Fosse and star Roy Scheider are at the top of their games in this dazzling, self-aware stage drama about a death-obsessed director-choreographer."

In his review in The New York Times, Vincent Canby called the film "an uproarious display of brilliance, nerve, dance, maudlin confessions, inside jokes and, especially, ego" and "an essentially funny movie that seeks to operate on too many levels at the same time... some of it makes you wince, but a lot of it is great fun... A key to the success of the production is the performance of Roy Scheider as Joe Gideon... With an actor of less weight and intensity, All That Jazz might have evaporated as we watched it. Mr. Scheider's is a presence to reckon with."

Variety described it as "a self-important, egomaniacal, wonderfully choreographed, often compelling film" and added, "Roy Scheider gives a superb performance as Gideon, creating a character filled with nervous energy... The film's major flaw lies in its lack of real explanation of what, beyond ego, really motivates [him]."

TV Guide said, "The dancing is frenzied, the dialogue piercing, the photography superb, and the acting first-rate, with non-showman Scheider an illustrious example of casting against type . . . All That Jazz is great-looking but not easy to watch. Fosse's indulgent vision at times approaches sour self-loathing."

Leonard Maltin gave the film two-and-a-half stars (out of four) in his 2009 movie guide; he said that the film was "self-indulgent and largely negative," and that "great show biz moments and wonderful dancing are eventually buried in pretensions"; he also called the ending "an interminable finale which leaves a bad taste for the whole film."

Time Out London states, "As translated onto screen, [Fosse's] story is wretched: the jokes are relentlessly crass and objectionable; the song 'n' dance routines have been created in the cutting-room and have lost any sense of fun; Fellini-esque moments add little but pretension; and scenes of a real open-heart operation, alternating with footage of a symbolic Angel of Death in veil and white gloves, fail even in terms of the surreal."

Upon release in 1979, director Stanley Kubrick, who is mentioned in the movie, reportedly called it "[the] best film I think I have ever seen".
In 2001, All That Jazz was deemed "culturally, historically, or aesthetically significant" by the Library of Congress and selected for preservation in the National Film Registry. It was also preserved by the Academy Film Archive in the same year. In 2006, the film was ranked #14 by the American Film Institute on its list of the Greatest Movie Musicals.

The film would be the last musical nominated for the Academy Award for Best Picture until Disney's Beauty and the Beast was nominated in 1992, and was the last live-action musical to compete in the category until Baz Luhrmann's Moulin Rouge! was nominated in 2002, 22 years later.

Accolades

Honors 
 In 2001, it was listed as one of the films under the National Film Preservation Board
 AFI's Greatest Movie Musicals — #14
 AFI's 100 Years... 100 Movie Quotes
 "It's showtime!" (nominated)
 In 2012, the Motion Picture Editors Guild listed the film as the fourth best edited film of all time based on a survey of its membership.

Home media
The DVD issued in 2003 features scene-specific commentary by Roy Scheider and interviews with Scheider and Fosse. Fox released a "Special Music Edition" DVD in 2007, with an audio commentary by the film's Oscar-winning editor, Alan Heim. Blu-ray and DVD editions were released in August 2014 with all the old special features, as well as new supplements through The Criterion Collection brand.

Legacy 
The final dance sequence of All That Jazz is depicted in FX's Fosse/Verdon starring Sam Rockwell as Bob Fosse. The series' executive producer and Broadway star Lin-Manuel Miranda played the dual role of Joe Gideon/Roy Scheider. The "Get Happy" dream sequence musical number in the season 7 House episode "Bombshells" was also inspired by this dance sequence.

The film is referenced heavily in the Better Call Saul episode: "Mijo". During the episode, there is a montage in which Jimmy's (Bob Odenkirk) routine is revealed: Grabbing his coffee, defending clients, collecting his check, and his ongoing battle with the parking attendant, Mike (Jonathan Banks). During his routine he always looks in the mirror and says "It's showtime, folks!", a line from All That Jazz.

Season 3 Episode 5 of GLOW "Freaky Tuesday" opens with the same Vivaldi concerto music while the character Tammé is shown struggling, with the help of pills and wine and hot showers, to wake up every morning and tamp down her back pain while continuing to perform as a wrestler each night.

The finale of the Adult Swim series Eagleheart concludes with a recreation of the "Bye Bye Life" sequence, with Chris Monsanto (Chris Elliott) as Joe Gideon.

The David Fincher–directed music video for Paula Abdul's song "Cold Hearted" is inspired by the "Take Off With Us" dance sequence in All That Jazz.

References

Citations

General and cited references

External links

 
 
 
 
 
 
 All That Jazz: Stardust an essay by Hilton Als at the Criterion Collection
 All That Jazz essay by Daniel Eagan in America's Film Legacy: The Authoritative Guide to the Landmark Movies in the National Film Registry, A&C Black, 2010 , pages 759-761 

1979 films
1970s musical drama films
1970s dance films
American dance films
American musical drama films
Films directed by Bob Fosse
Films that won the Best Original Score Academy Award
Films about angels
Films about death
Films about film directors and producers
Films about musical theatre
Films set in New York City
Films shot in New York City
Films whose art director won the Best Art Direction Academy Award
Films whose editor won the Best Film Editing Academy Award
Palme d'Or winners
United States National Film Registry films
Columbia Pictures films
20th Century Fox films
Jukebox musical films
Films that won the Best Costume Design Academy Award
Films set in a theatre
Films about personifications of death
Films à clef
1979 drama films
1970s English-language films
1970s American films